Jean-Marie Aimot (1901–1968) was a French novelist, critic, biographer and translator who was active in the middle third of the 20th century. His books include Nos mitrailleuses n'ont pas tiré which won the Prix des Deux Magots in 1941 and La Carrière de Raoul Champfrond, a novel which won the Prix Balzac in 1944. He wrote biographies of Mané-Katz and Henry Morton Stanley.

A member of the collaborationist French Popular Party, Aimot was associated with the extreme right/fascist wing of French politics. He served as director of the French Documentary Film Service under the Vichy government.

Selected works
 Lilian Harvey (1932)
 Mané-Katz (1933)
 Nos mitrailleuses n'ont pas tiré: journal d'une section de D.A.T. (1941)
 La Carriere de Raoul Champfrond: roman (1944)
 Stanley, le dernier conquistador (1951)
 Drieu la Rochelle: témoignages et documents (1958)

References 

20th-century French novelists
French biographers
French male novelists
Prix des Deux Magots winners
French collaborators with Nazi Germany
20th-century French male writers
French male non-fiction writers
Male biographers